MTOM may refer to:

 Maximum takeoff mass, also known as maximum takeoff weight
 Message Transmission Optimization Mechanism